Patrick Burns may refer to:

 Patrick Burns (businessman) (1856–1937), Canadian rancher, businessman, and Senator
 Patrick Burns (paranormal investigator) (born 1968), American paranormal investigator
 Patrick J. Burns, mayor of Bathurst, New Brunswick, 1912–1915
 Pat Burns (1952–2010), Canadian ice hockey coach
 Pat Burns (broadcaster) (1921–1996), Canadian talk show host and reporter

See also 
 Pat Byrnes, cartoonist, and husband of Illinois attorney general
 Patrick Byrne (disambiguation)